Mystery Island is a 1937 Australian film shot almost entirely on location near Lord Howe Island. It is best remembered for the mysterious disappearance of two of its cast after filming completed.

Plot
Two women and eight men are shipwrecked on a South Pacific island. There is a murderer amongst them. Only the murderer and the ship's captain knows his identity but the captain has lost his memory.

Cast
Brian Abbot as Morris Carthew
 Jean Laidley as Audrey Challoner
 W. Lane-Bayliff as Captain Druce
 William Carroll as Chief Officer Vowels
 George Doran	as Reverend Abel
 Edward Druitt	as Seabright
 Desmond Hay (Leslie Hay-Simpson) as Packer
 Mollie Kerwin as Miss Fortescue
 Moncrieff Macallum as Green
 Douglas Mackinnon as Cook

Production
The movie was mostly funded by Jack Bruce, who was the managing director of Commonwealth Film Laboratories.

It was shot almost entirely on one of the Admiralty Inlets near Lord Howe Island. A production unit of 20 sailed from Sydney in September 1936, taking £10,000 worth of equipment. Shooting went for a month and was marked by a number of difficulties, including constant rain, poor sound, the loss of 2,000 feet of exposed film which had to be reshot.

The female lead, Jean Laidley (real name Jean Mort), had experience in amateur theatre. She was great-granddaughter of Thomas Sutcliffe Mort.

The unit returned to Sydney on 6 October. The shipwreck scene was completed in the studio of Commonwealth FIlm Laboratories in Sydney, being staged with models.

Early newspaper reports that the film was based on a story by Bruce Bairnsfather were scotched by his less famous brother, Captain T. D. Bairnsfather (died 18 April 1949), an employee of Sydney radio station 2KY, who claimed the credit (or took the blame). The screenplay was written by Harry Lauder, a nephew of Harry Lauder, the great Scottish comedian.

Disappearance
Actors Brian Abbot and Leslie Hay-Simpson elected to stay on the island for a few weeks after filming, intending to sail back to the mainland together in a 16-foot open boat, called the Mystery Star, which Abbot brought over with him.

They left for Sydney on 6 October 1936 expecting to take 10–14 days. By 14 October a search had been launched. They were never heard of again.

Reception
The film was released as a supporting feature. Reviews praised the scenery but were less fulsome about its dramatic qualities.

Brian Abbot's (real name George Rikard Bell) widow later sued his life assurance company for £1000, the amount payable on his death but refused by the company. The insurers' defence, led by Clive Evatt, KC, pointed out that the trip was a risky endeavor not disclosed to the insurers. The case was settled out of court.

References

External links 

Mystery Island at Australian Screen Online
Mystery Island at Oz Movies
Article written by Abbot on the island shortly before his death

1937 films
Australian black-and-white films
1930s English-language films